St Winefride's Halt railway station was a station in Holywell, Flintshire, Wales. The station was opened on 1 July 1912 and closed on 6 September 1954. Situated on a bend there was a curved wooden platform with just the name board and gas lighting. There was a siding running behind the platform at a lower level to serve local industries. There are no remains of the halt today.

References

Further reading

Disused railway stations in Flintshire
Railway stations in Great Britain opened in 1912
Railway stations in Great Britain closed in 1954
Former London and North Western Railway stations